The Sweden national korfball team is managed by the Svenska Korfballförbundet (SKF), representing Sweden in korfball international competitions.

Tournament history

Current squad
National team in the 2009 European Bowl

 Coach: Atte Van Haastrecht

References

External links
Svenska Korfballförbundet

National korfball teams
Korfball
National team